Mubami is a Papuan language of Papua New Guinea. It goes by the names Dausame, Tao-Suamato, Tao-Suame, and Ta.
The language is used in all age groups and domains of life, including education, and is therefore counted as not presently endangered.

It is spoken in Diwami, Kubeai, Parieme, Paueme, Sogae, Ugu, and Waliho villages on the Guavi and Aramia rivers in Western Province, Papua New Guinea.

A word list of Mubami can be found in Z'graggen (1975)

References

External links 
Mubami. New Guinea World.

Inland Gulf languages
Languages of Papua New Guinea